Pteronemacheilus lucidorsum is a species of stone loach endemic to the Irrawaddy Basin, Myanmar.

References

*Bohlen, J. & Šlechtová, V. (2011): A new genus and two new species of loaches (Teleostei: Nemacheilidae) from Myanmar.  Ichthyological Exploration of Freshwaters, 22 (1): 1-10.

Nemacheilidae
Fish of Myanmar
Endemic fauna of Myanmar
Fish described in 2011